Brookfield Air Force Station is a closed United States Air Force General Surveillance Radar station. It was closed in 1959.

History
Brookfield  Air Force Station constructed as part of the Air Defense Command permanent network it was opened in April 1952.

The 662d Aircraft Control and Warning Squadron began operations with AN/FPS-3 and AN/FPS-5 radars, and initially the station functioned as a Ground-Control Intercept (GCI) and warning station.  As a GCI station, the squadron's role was to guide interceptor aircraft toward unidentified intruders picked up on the unit's radar scopes.  This operation allowed Lashup site L-18 at Ravenna, Ohio, to shut down. In 1957 the AN/FPS-5 height-finder radar was replaced with an AN/FPS-4, and then the AN/FPS-4 was replaced with an AN/FPS-6 in 1958.

In addition to the main facility, Brookfield operated two unmanned AN/FPS-14 (P-62B) and AN/FPS-18 (P-62A) Gap Filler sites
 Thompson, Ohio    (P-62A) 
 Lewisville, Ohio  (P-62B) 

The P-62 site designation and the 662d Radar Squadron were transferred to Oakdale AFS, Pennsylvania, when radar operations ceased at Brookfield AFS on 1 Nov 1959 due to budget considerations.  This site at Brookfield became a gap-filler radar site (RP-62E) for Oakdale. The Brookfield site operated as a gap-filler annex from Feb 1964 until June 1968. The GATR site (R-12) at Brookfield also remained in operation

After the site was closed by the military, the property was acquired by Trumbull County, Ohio, and the buildings were turned into the Trumbull County Nursing Home Facility.    In the early 1980s, the nursing home was closed due to budget issues, and the Air Force closed down the R-12 GATR site.   Today, the site is abandoned, with buildings in a severe state of decay.   Roofs are collapsing, floors and roofs are caving in and concrete is deteriorating.   Animals are frequently found in the buildings as well as the occasional human vandal.

In September 2012, the property was sold to a private entity.   It is patrolled by the police, and is not open to the public   The owners are not friendly to trespassers.

In 2011, Brookfield Police officiated the release for a student-made independent short film to be filmed on the premises which filmed primarily in summer of 2012. The set was of interest to the filmmakers due to its publicity from the infamous 1994 alleged UFO sightings.

Air Force units and assignments

Units
 662d Aircraft Control and Warning Squadron, 
 Activated at Selfridge AFB, MI (L-17), 18 April 1950, not operational
 Moved to Lashup site L-18 at Ravenna, OH, 1 January 1951
 Moved to Brookfield AFS on 1 October 1951
 Moved to Oakdale AFS, PA, 1 November 1959 when site inactivated.

Assignments
 541st Aircraft Control and Warning Group (30th Air Division), 18 April 1950
 30th Air Division, 6 February 1952
 4708th Defense Wing, 16 February 1953
 30th Air Division, 8 July 1956
 Detroit Air Defense Sector, 1 April-1 November 1959

See also
 List of USAF Aerospace Defense Command General Surveillance Radar Stations

References

  Cornett, Lloyd H. and Johnson, Mildred W., A Handbook of Aerospace Defense Organization  1946 - 1980, Office of History, Aerospace Defense Center, Peterson AFB, CO (1980).
 Winkler, David F. & Webster, Julie L., Searching the Skies, The Legacy of the United States Cold War Defense Radar Program, US Army Construction Engineering Research Laboratories, Champaign, IL (1997).
 Information for Brookfield AFS, OH

External links
  Abandoned Brookfield Air Force Station

Installations of the United States Air Force in Ohio
Radar stations of the United States Air Force
Aerospace Defense Command military installations
Military installations established in 1952
Military installations closed in 1959
1952 establishments in Ohio
1959 disestablishments in Ohio
Buildings and structures in Trumbull County, Ohio